The Verdin Baronetcy, of the Brocklehurst in the Parish of Davenham and of Wimboldsley in the Parish of Middlewich, both in the County Palatine of Chester, was a title in the Baronetage of the United Kingdom. It was created on 24 July 1896 for Sir Joseph Verdin. In 1895, he donated money to set up the Verdin Technical Schools in Winsford (later closed and developed into the present The Winsford Academy) and Northwich, Cheshire. The title became extinct on his death in 1920.

Verdin baronets, of the Brocklehurst and Wimboldsley (1896)
Sir Joseph Verdin, 1st Baronet (1838–1920)

References

Extinct baronetcies in the Baronetage of the United Kingdom